Donovan Solano Preciado (born December 17, 1987) is a Colombian professional baseball second baseman for the Minnesota Twins of Major League Baseball (MLB). He has previously played in MLB for the Miami Marlins, New York Yankees, San Francisco Giants and Cincinnati Reds. Solano signed as an international free agent with the St. Louis Cardinals in 2005. He made his MLB debut with the Marlins in 2012.

Professional career
Solano was born and raised in Barranquilla, Colombia.

St. Louis Cardinals

Solano signed as an international free agent with the St. Louis Cardinals in 2005. He spent seven seasons in the Cardinals organization as a backup infielder, but never made it to the major leagues with them. In 2008, he was a mid-season All Star with the Palm Beach Cardinals in the Class A-Advanced Florida State League.

Miami Marlins
In 2012, the Miami Marlins invited Solano to spring training as a non-roster invitee. Solano competed for the reserve infielder role with the Marlins, but the job went to Donnie Murphy and Solano was assigned to the New Orleans Zephyrs of the Class AAA Pacific Coast League. He received his first promotion to MLB by the Marlins on May 20, 2012, becoming the 12th Colombian-born player to reach the major leagues, at 24 years of age. On May 23, 2012, he singled in his first career at-bat.

Solano's first career major league start was on May 26, 2012, against the San Francisco Giants. He went 2-for-4 with two hits and a run batted in. With the trade of Hanley Ramírez to the Los Angeles Dodgers in July 2012, Solano competed with Donnie Murphy and Greg Dobbs for playing time at third base, as Emilio Bonifacio took over second base following the trade that sent Omar Infante to the Detroit Tigers. After Bonifacio injured his knee, Solano took over second while Murphy, Dobbs, and Gil Velazquez competed to be the starting third baseman. Solano finished the season batting .295/.342/.375 in 285 at bats with two home runs, 11 doubles, three triples, 28 RBIs, 21 walks, and seven stolen bases. He was named to the Baseball America Major League All Rookie Team.

The Marlins placed Solano on the disabled list on May 7, 2013, retroactive to May 4. He returned and played in 102 games, batting .249/.305/.316. He batted .316 with runners in scoring position. He was named the Wilson Team Defensive Player of the Year, playing primarily second base.

In 2014, he appeared in 111 games for the Marlins, batting .252/.300/.323. In 2015, his last year with Miami, he appeared in only 55 games, splitting time between shortstop, third base, and second base, with a dismal .189 batting average.

New York Yankees
On January 9, 2016, the New York Yankees signed Solano to a minor league contract. He spent the 2016 season with the Class AAA Scranton/Wilkes-Barre RailRiders, with whom he was a postseason All-Star after batting .319 (eighth in the International League)/.349/.436 with 33 doubles (tied for third in the league), seven home runs, seven sacrifice flies (leading the league), and 67 RBIs (tied for fourth) in 511 at-bats. He was promoted to the major leagues on September 18, following an injury to Starlin Castro, and in 22 at-bats he hit .227/.261/.455. The Yankees outrighted him to Scranton/Wilkes-Barre after the regular season.

He spent the entire 2017 season with Scranton/Wilkes-Barre, hitting .282/.329/.391 with 44 runs, 29 doubles (tied for 9th in the league), four home runs, and 48 RBIs in 373 at bats. He batted .330 with runners in scoring position. Following the season, he played for Tigres del Licey of the Dominican Winter League, hitting .371/.400/.468 in 62 at bats. He elected free agency on November 6, 2017.

Los Angeles Dodgers
On January 19, 2018, the Los Angeles Dodgers signed Solano to a minor league contract. He played in 81 games for the Class AAA Oklahoma City Dodgers of the Pacific Coast League, batting .318./.353/.430 in 314 at-bats.

San Francisco Giants
On December 18, 2018, Solano signed a minor league deal with the San Francisco Giants. With the Class AAA Sacramento River Cats of the Pacific Coast League, in 2019 he batted .322/.392/.437 with two home runs and 16 RBIs in 87 at-bats. With the Giants in 2019, he batted .330/.360/.456 with 27 runs, four home runs, and 23 RBIs in 215 at-bats, and had a line drive rate that led all players in the league with 200 or more at-bats (33.9%), as he played primarily second base while also pinch hitting, playing shortstop, and appearing at third base. In December, he and the Giants agreed to a one-year, $1.375 million contract.

On September 1, 2020, Solano had a career-high 6 RBIs in a 23-5 blowout win over the Colorado Rockies. He ended the 2020 season batting a career-high .326 (5th in the NL)/.365/.463, with a career-high 15 doubles (fourth), three home runs, 29 RBIs, and three sacrifice flies (seventh) in 190 at-bats in 54 games, which won him the National League's second baseman Silver Slugger Award.

In the 2021 regular season, Solano batted .280/.344/.404 with 35 runs, seven home runs, and 31 RBIs in 307 at bats. He primarily played second base, with two games at shortstop. His salary was $3.25 million. Solano became a free agent following the 2021 season.

Cincinnati Reds

On March 16, 2022, Solano signed a one-year, $4.5 million contract with the Cincinnati Reds. In April, Solano received a platelet-rich plasma injection to address lingering pain in his left hamstring, and was placed on the 60-day injured list on May 23. After starting the season on the injured list, he made his first appearance for the Reds on June 22, 2022. Solano appeared in 80 games for Cincinnati, slashing .284/.339/.385 with 4 home runs and 24 RBI.

Minnesota Twins
On February 23, 2023, Solano signed a one-year, major league contract with the Minnesota Twins.

International career
He was a member of Team Colombia in the 2017 World Baseball Classic, along with his brother Jhonatan. Solano batted 3-for-14 and Colombia was eliminated in the first round.

Personal life
Solano is a Christian. His brother, Jhonatan Solano, is a catcher who made his debut in 2012 for the Washington Nationals.

See also
List of Major League Baseball players from Colombia

References

External links

1987 births
Living people
Águilas Cibaeñas players
Arizona League Dodgers players
Cincinnati Reds players
Colombian expatriate baseball players in the Dominican Republic
Colombian expatriate baseball players in the United States
Johnson City Cardinals players
Jupiter Hammerheads players
Major League Baseball players from Colombia
Major League Baseball second basemen
Memphis Redbirds players
Miami Marlins players
New Jersey Cardinals players
New Orleans Zephyrs players
New York Yankees players
Oklahoma City Dodgers players
Palm Beach Cardinals players
Sacramento River Cats players
San Francisco Giants players
Scranton/Wilkes-Barre RailRiders players
Silver Slugger Award winners
Sportspeople from Barranquilla
Springfield Cardinals players
State College Spikes players
Swing of the Quad Cities players
Tigres del Licey players
2017 World Baseball Classic players